Ski Martock is a ski resort located near Windsor, Nova Scotia, Canada.  The facilities feature a downhill area served by a quad chair lift and two T-bars(one functional), a beginners area served by Magic Carpet.

The hill features a terrain park for snowboarding and freeskiing. It is the second largest ski hill in Nova Scotia, second only to Ski Wentworth.

Martock is the closest downhill ski area to the Halifax Regional Municipality, Atlantic Canada's largest city, being roughly a 45-minute drive away. During the 2011 Canada Winter Games, it hosted the cross country skiing events.

Trails

Lifts 
Ski Martock has 1 Quad Chairlift , 1 T-Bar, and 1 Magic Carpet lift for the bunny hill, all which are operational.

See also
List of ski areas and resorts in Canada

References

External links
Official website of the resort

Martock
Tourist attractions in Hants County, Nova Scotia
2011 Canada Winter Games
Buildings and structures in Hants County, Nova Scotia